Camden High School is a public high school in the village of Camden, New York.  The school district includes the towns of Camden, Vienna, Annsville, and Florence in northwestern Oneida County and the town of Osceola in southwestern Lewis County. Students come from Camden Middle School.

Notable alumni
 Lynn Lovenguth, former Major League Baseball pitcher

See also
Camden (village), New York
Camden (town), New York

References

External links
Camden High School website
Camden History Video
Village of Camden, NY

Public high schools in New York (state)
Schools in Oneida County, New York